The Peșteana (also: Pesceana) is a right tributary of the river Olteț in Romania. It discharges into the Olteț in Bălcești. It flows through the villages Poienari, Ghioroiu, Herăști, Știrbești, Căzănești and Bălcești.

References

Rivers of Romania
Rivers of Vâlcea County